Cogburn is a surname. Notable people with the surname include:

Cameron Cogburn (born 1986), American cyclist
Max O. Cogburn Jr. (born 1951), American judge

Fictional characters:

Rooster Cogburn (character)
Rooster Cogburn (film)

See also
Coburn (surname)